Hygronemobius is a genus of insect in family Gryllidae.

Taxonomy
The Orthoptera Species File database lists the following species groups and species:
Hygronemobius amoenus Chopard, 1920
Hygronemobius albolineatus Desutter-Grandcolas, 1993
Hygronemobius amoenus Chopard, 1920
Hygronemobius boreus Desutter-Grandcolas, 1993
Hygronemobius torquatus Desutter-Grandcolas, 1993
Hygronemobius benoisti Chopard, 1920
Hygronemobius benoisti Chopard, 1920
Hygronemobius diplagion Desutter-Grandcolas, 1993
Hygronemobius elegans Desutter-Grandcolas, 1993
Hygronemobius tetraplagion Desutter-Grandcolas, 1993
Hygronemobius stellatus Desutter-Grandcolas, 1993
Hygronemobius nanus Desutter-Grandcolas, 1993
Hygronemobius nigrofasciatus Desutter-Grandcolas, 1993
Hygronemobius stellatus Desutter-Grandcolas, 1993
Hygronemobius albipalpus (Saussure, 1877)
Hygronemobius alleni (Morse, 1905)
Hygronemobius araucanus (Saussure, 1874)
Hygronemobius basalis (Walker, 1869)
Hygronemobius daphne Otte & Peck, 1998
Hygronemobius darienicus Hebard, 1928
Hygronemobius dialeucus Martins & Pereira, 2014
Hygronemobius dissimilis (Saussure, 1874)
Hygronemobius duckensis (Martins & Pereira, 2014
Hygronemobius epia Otte & Perez-Gelabert, 2009
Hygronemobius guriri Pereira, Miyoshi & Martins, 2013
Hygronemobius histrionicus histrionicus Zayas, 1974
Hygronemobius indaia Pereira, Miyoshi & Martins, 2013
Hygronemobius iperoigae Pereira, Miyoshi & Martins, 2013
Hygronemobius liura Hebard, 1915
Hygronemobius longespinosus Chopard, 1956
Hygronemobius minutipennis Bruner, 1916
Hygronemobius nemoralis (Saussure, 1874)
Hygronemobius speculi (McNeill, 1901)

References

Ground crickets